Walter Beauchamp (20 December 1887 – 8 July 1976) was a South African cricketer. He played in four first-class match for Border from 1913/14 to 1923/24.

See also
 List of Border representative cricketers

References

External links
 

1887 births
1967 deaths
South African cricketers
Border cricketers
Sportspeople from Qonce